2-Furoyl chloride is an acyl chloride of furan. It takes the form of a corrosive liquid, which is more irritating to the eyes than benzoyl chloride. 2-Furoyl chloride is a useful pharmaceutical intermediate and is used in the synthesis of mometasone furoate, an antiinflammatory prodrug used in the treatment of skin disorders, hay fever and asthma.

Synthesis 
2-Furoyl chloride was prepared in 1924 by Gelissen by refluxing 2-furoic acid in excess thionyl chloride on a water bath.

Applications 
2-Furoyl chloride has no major applications but it has been used as a chemical intermediate in the synthesis of various pharmaceuticals; examples include mometasone furoate, fluticasone furoate, diloxanide furoate, Ceftiofur (Excenel), mirfentanil, quinfamide, and diclofurime.

See also
Furfurylamine - corresponding amine
Furfuryl alcohol - corresponding alcohol
Furan-2-ylmethanethiol - corresponding thiol
2-Furoic acid - corresponding carboxylic acid

References 

2-Furyl compounds
Acyl chlorides